"50 Grand" is a song by English rapper Devlin, released May 11, 2015. It's produced by Term & Ratchet. It features vocals from Skepta.

Release 
The single was released under record label Island Records. It was Devlin's first release after his 18-month break from music.

Track listing 
 Devlin - "50 Grand" ft. Skepta 
 "50 Grand" ft. Skepta

Video 
The video for "50 Grand" was uploaded to YouTube on June 12, 2015. The video shows Skepta running away from people who have seen his jewelry and it also shows Devlin walking around a London estate.

References 

2015 singles
2015 songs
Devlin (rapper) songs
Skepta songs
Island Records singles
Songs written by Skepta